Sir Walter St John, 3rd Baronet (May 1622 – 3 July 1708), of Lydiard Tregoze, Wiltshire, and of Battersea (succeeded in 1657), was an English MP.

Biography
He was the sixth son of Sir John St John, 1st Baronet of Lydiate Tregoze and inherited the baronetcy on the death of his nephew
Sir John St John, 2nd Baronet (c. 1637–1657), the son and heir of Oliver, the son and heir apparent of Sir John, 1st Baronet.  

In 1656, Sir Walter was Member of Parliament for Wiltshire (1656–1658 and 1659); for Wootton Bassett (1660–1679); and again for Wiltshire (1679–1681 and 1690–1695). He was famed for "piety and moral virtues".

In 1700, Sir Walter signed a trust deed that led to the formation of a school which later became the Sir Walter St John's School of Battersea.

Sir Walter died in his 87th year on 3 July 1708, and was buried on 9 July at Battersea. On his death the baronetcy passed to a grandson Henry St John who was created a viscount in 1716.

Family

Sir Walter married, in or before 1651, Johanna a daughter of Oliver St John, of Longthorpe county Northampton, Lord Chief Justice of the Common Pleas (1648–1660) and his first wife Johanna daughter and heir of Sir James Altham. Johanna died three years before Sir Walter.  They had thirteen children, but seven of them did not survive to adulthood. His daughter, Anne St. John, married Thomas Cholmondeley, (twice MP for Cheshire), (b. 1627).

Notes

References

Further reading
Cobbett's Parliamentary history of England, from the Norman Conquest in 1066 to the year 1803 (London: Thomas Hansard, 1808) 

1622 births
1708 deaths
Baronets in the Baronetage of England
People from Battersea
People from Swindon
Walter
English MPs 1656–1658
English MPs 1659
English MPs 1661–1679
English MPs 1679
English MPs 1681
English MPs 1690–1695
Members of the Parliament of England (pre-1707) for Wiltshire